No Man's Land is a 1998 role-playing game adventure for Call of Cthulhu published by Chaosium.

Plot summary
No Man's Land is an adventure in which the Argonne forest during World War I is the setting.

Reception
No Man's Land was reviewed in the online second version of Pyramid which said "it's no secret I'm a big Call of Cthulhu fan. If you ever wanted to know why, you need go no further than No Man's Land, a new scenario that is a brilliant melding of Cthulhu Mythos horror with the more mundane, human-inflicted kind."

Reviews
Backstab #12

References

Call of Cthulhu (role-playing game) adventures
Role-playing game supplements introduced in 1998